{{DISPLAYTITLE:C42H32O9}}
The molecular formula C42H32O9 (molar mass: 680.69 g/mol, exact mass: 680.204633 u) may refer to: 
 Miyabenol C, a resveratrol trimer
 Trans-Diptoindonesin B, an oligomeric stilbenoid

Molecular formulas